Hollis Taylor is an American-born Australian zoomusicologist and composer and a violinist and fiddler. She has argued that birdsong should be approached as music.

Early life and education 
Taylor was born in the United States. She graduated from West Linn High School in West Linn, Oregon. She graduated from Webster University in St. Louis with a bachelor's degree in violin performance. In 2009 she received a PhD from the University of Western Sydney School of Communication Arts with a concentration in musicology, ornithology, and composition.

Work

Composition and performance 
Taylor played with the Oregon Symphony while still a teenager. She was the 1982 Oregon Old Time Fiddle Champion. During the 1980s and 1990s she headed the Hollis Taylor Band, an acoustic country trio, and was a member of other groups. She became concertmaster at Wolf Trap.

Since 2005, Taylor has recorded the song of the pied butcherbird, an Australian songbird known for its unusually complex and beautiful singing, and used it to compose Absolute Bird: Concerto for Recorder and Orchestra, which was performed in 2017 by the Adelaide Symphony Orchestra. She co-composed with Jon Rose Bitter Springs Creek 2014, which featured butcherbird songs she recorded in the MacDonnell Ranges in 2014 

In 2017, she produced a double album, Absolute Bird, which featured birdsong, cane toad, and other field recordings.

Academic research 
According to the Sydney Morning Herald, Taylor "established that not only is it possible to identify individual birds by their calls but that those calls evolve over time." She has argued that birdsong is music; traditional musicology excludes anything not created by humans. Taylor argues that the song of the pied butcherbird, in addition to being a form of communication, has an aesthetic character, with technique and inventiveness similar to human compositions, and that along with behavioral evidence supports the conclusion that birds have an aesthetic sensibility which may be analogous to that of humans. 

In 2019, Taylor was appointed an Australia Research Council Future Fellow at Macquarie University.

Books 

 Is Birdsong Music? (2017). Indiana University Press.

Personal life 
Taylor has lived in Sydney since 2002. She has both US and Australian citizenship. Her partner is Jon Rose.

References 

Living people
Year of birth missing (living people)
American violinists
Australian violinists
Women violinists
American fiddlers
American ornithologists
Australian ornithologists
American musicologists
Australian musicologists
American composers
American women composers
Australian composers
Australian women composers
People from Clackamas County, Oregon
Musicians from Portland, Oregon
Musicians from Sydney
Washington University in St. Louis alumni
Western Sydney University alumni
Academic staff of Macquarie University